Dentontown is an unincorporated community in Calhoun County, Mississippi, United States.

A post office operated under the name Denton from 1900 to 1904.

References

Unincorporated communities in Calhoun County, Mississippi
Unincorporated communities in Mississippi